Võisiku is a village in Põltsamaa Parish, Jõgeva County, in central Estonia. It is located about 5 km southwest from the town of Põltsamaa. Võisiku has a population of 376 (as of 2010).

Võisiku Manor
Võisiku estate was first mentioned in 1558. The current building was constructed in the second half of the 18th century. A veranda was added at a later date.

Timotheus Eberhard von Bock (1787-1836), about whom Jaan Kross has written one of his most well-known novels, The Czar's Madman, lived at Võisiku manor.

Chess player and endgame composer Friedrich Amelung was born at Võisiku Manor in 1842.

References

External links
Võisiku Manor at Estonian Manors Portal

Villages in Jõgeva County
Manor houses in Estonia
Kreis Fellin